Chloe Dzubilo (December 5, 1960 – February 18, 2011) was an American artist, musician, and transgender activist. She was born in Connecticut.

Dzubilo was a fixture of the 1980s and 1990s New York City club and art scene: she briefly worked at Studio 54, was an editor at the East Village Eye, worked with Blacklips Performance Cult at the Pyramid Club, and she was the lead singer and songwriter of the punk band Transisters, who performed at CBGB's. Filmmaker Kembra Pfahler said of Dzubilo's band, “Transisters was one of the only bands that addressed issues around AIDS and had the courage to sing about their anger. And to alchemically transform all of the hatred and stigma around the disease itself.”  Dzubilo's artwork took many forms, and she often worked in ink on paper as her medium.

Chloe studied art at Parsons School of Design and received an associate degree in Gender Studies from the City University of New York in 1999.

She became an influence of fashion designers including Marc Jacobs and Patricia Field.

Activism 
Dzubilo was a longtime transgender activist with the Gender Identity Project at the NYC LGBT Community Center, and after her HIV diagnosis in 1987 became involved in AIDS activism. She joined the political group Transgender Menace and was the founder of the Equi-Aid Project, a horse-riding program for AIDS-affected and at-risk youth. Additionally she participated in SpeakOUT events as a panelist where she talked about issues of substance abuse recovery along with activists like Alison Terson. She was appointed to the HIV and Human Service Planning Council of New York in 2003.

Legacy and archive 
When askedby the magazine HIV Plus in 1998 what advice she would give, she said, "Buy a lot of glitter and pat it on your eyes first thing in the morning - it's good for your endorphins. Empower yourself with the word tacky. And sing. All day. That's what I do."

Her funeral was held on March 12, 2011, at Judson Memorial Church. Fellow artists, activists, and friends who attended include Rosario Dawson, Anohni, Justin Bond, and Katrina Del Mar.

In 2011, the Chloe Awards were established to celebrate people whose work embodies the spirit of Marsha P. Johnson, Sylvia Rivera, and Chloe Dzubilo. The Chloe Faith Dzubilo Papers are held in the Fales Library and Special Collections at New York University.

In 2017, her work was featured in the exhibition "AIDS at Home" at the Museum of the City of New York.

References

External links 

 Chloe Faith Dzubilo Papers at the Fales Library & Special Collections, New York University

1960 births
2011 deaths
20th-century American women artists
21st-century American women artists
American women rock singers
City University of New York alumni
HIV/AIDS activists
American LGBT artists
21st-century LGBT people
20th-century American women musicians
21st-century American women musicians
Transgender women
Transgender artists
Transgender singers
Transgender women musicians
Women in punk